Search is a South Korean television series starring Jang Dong-yoon, Krystal Jung, Moon Jeong-hee, Yoon Park and Lee Hyun-wook. It follows the story of the ruthless attack of an unknown creature in the Korean Demilitarized Zone, and the search operation of elite special force to uncover the truth. It aired on OCN from October 17 to November 15, 2020, every Saturday and Sunday at 22:30 (KST). The series is available for streaming with multi-languages subtitles on iQIYI in South East Asia, Hong Kong, Macau and Taiwan.

Synopsis
Search is a military thriller drama which takes place in the demilitarized zone (DMZ) and tells the story of a specialized search party that forms to uncover the truth behind mysterious disappearance and murder cases.

Cast and characters

Main
 Jang Dong-yoon as Yong Dong-jin
 Yong Dong-jin is a sergeant and special military dog handler who follows the traces of the enemy. Before receiving the national call, he also had a history of volunteering abroad at a Korean-American animal protection group on the veterinary road. When it is decided to send a reconnaissance and pursuit dog to the Choi Jeong-ye special lease, he joins the search team as the youngest member. He is in charge of Korea's best military dog.
 Krystal Jung as Son Ye-rim
 First Lieutenant Son Ye-rim is a senior lieutenant and an elite officer from the Women's University School Corps, and is currently an officer at the KCST Command Center. As a school district candidate, she ranked first in the appointment grade with her superior skills. She was the first to be put into service when a situation occurred in the DMZ GP. At the special assignment, where she joins as a special officer, she meets her ex-boyfriend Yong Dong-jin again.
 Moon Jeong-hee as Kim Da-jeong
 Kim Da-jeong is a special officer who protects the DMZ. She is the former Team Leader of the Special Forces' 709 Special Squadron Women's Company anti-terrorism unit and is currently the contract commentator at the DMZ Memorial Hall. She has a husband and a daughter, and they live together in Chengong-ri, the only civilian-occupied village within the DMZ.  However, when an incident occurs near the DMZ, Da-jeong was keen to protect her family and the villagers.
 Yoon Park as Song Min-gyu 
 Captain Song Min-gyu is Hwasaeng Defense Command's best elite officer with full specs. He was scheduled to be appointed as an operation officer at the headquarters of the Army after passing the rank of major with the highest rating, but becoming a military prosecutor suspect who is caught in an unsavory case and undergoes military trial. On the way of life and death, Song is selected as the leader of the North Star and gets the last chance. To get out of the crisis, he must succeed in this operation, but he has another reason to return to the demilitarized zone.
 Lee Hyun-wook as Lee Joon-sung
 First Lieutenant Lee Joon-sung is affiliated with a commando regiment that conducts special warfare directly under the command corps.  While attending university, he was transferred to the military academy and received the Presidential Award. A case breaks out in the DMZ, and he is selected as the deputy team leader of the special mission team. He unites the special lease into one with his unique gentle leadership, but engages in a subtle nervous war with Captain Song, who focuses only on the success of the operation.

Supporting
Special Polaris Mission Unit
 Lee Ha-yul as Park Ki-hyung
 Sergeant First Class Park Ki-hyung is an active duty sergeant who has is the third generation soldier in his family. He was supposed to get married but was assigned to the operation in the DMZ as a sniper.
 Choi Yoon-je as Staff Sergeant Ju Moon-chul

1997 Operation of the DMZ
 Yoo Sung-joo as Lee Hyuk
 Chairman of the National Defense Commission and National Assemblyman. He is running for the presidential elections.
 Choi Deok-moon as Han Dae-sik
 Han Dae-sik is the Commander of the Armed Forces of the Ministry of Defense of the Republic of Korea. He has risen to the present position by surviving a gunfight with the North Korean military in the DMZ in 1997, but suffers from post-traumatic stress disorder due to the shock of that accident. When a situation arises in the DMZ, he instructs Captain Song on a secret mission.
 Yeon Woo-jin as Captain Jo Min-gook
 Commander of the 1997 Search Operation in the DMZ.

Chengong-ri village people
 Lee Soon-won as Chun Min-jae, Da-jeong's husband and Su-yeong's father.
 Park Da-yeon as Chun Su-yeong, Da-jeong and Min-jae's 10-year-old daughter. A cheerful girl who is good at running and likes Sergeant Yong Dong-jin very much.
 Kim In-woo as Director Baek, the director of Chengong-ri Health Center.
Min Chae-yeon as Nurse Chae

Others
 Kim Ho-jung as Yong Hee-ra, Yong Dong-jin's mother, she runs a restaurant.
 Yoon Young-min as Lab Director Moon Ji-won, researcher at the KCST Command Center.

Production

Development
On October 25, 2019, OCN's marketing chief Choi Kyung-joo announced during the channel's "Thriller House" press conference that Search would be among the 11 television series which would air in 2020. Search is the fourth installment of OCN's "Dramatic Cinema" project (which combines film and drama formats), following Trap (2019), Hell Is Other People (2019) and Team Bulldog: Off-Duty Investigation (2020). It is also the first project of its newly launched OCN Studio division and South Korea's first military thriller drama set in the Korean Demilitarized Zone.

Casting
On November 29, 2019, it was reported that Jang Dong-yoon had been offered the role of Yong Dong-jin. On January 16, 2020, Krystal Jung and her agency SM Entertainment confirmed that she would play Son Ye-rim. Moon Jeong-hee officially joined the main cast on January 30. On February 13, OCN confirmed the series' final lineup with the addiction of Yoon Park and  Lee Hyun-wook. The first script reading took place in April 2020.

Filming
The series is entirely pre-produced; filming was completed in August 2020. According to director Lim Dae-woong, actors playing soldiers filmed some scenes with "over 20 kilograms of military gear on" in midsummer. Lim also mentioned that "real newspaper articles and news broadcasts" were sometimes used during filming, and that they "tried to make the clothes and equipment realistic too" though they could not "actually go [to the DMZ] to film."

Release
The first teaser, featuring Jang Dong-yoon and Krystal Jung, was released on April 27, 2020. On September 14, OCN released two posters featuring the main cast and the phrase "a fear that no one has ever seen," which announced that the series would premiere on October 17.

Ratings

International broadcast
The series is available on iQIYI with multi-languages subtitles in South East Asia, Taiwan, Hongkong, and Macau.

References

External links
  (in Korean)
 Search on iQIYI
 
 

OCN television dramas
Korean-language television shows
2020 South Korean television series debuts
2020 South Korean television series endings
South Korean military television series
South Korean mystery television series
South Korean thriller television series
Korean Demilitarized Zone in fiction
Television series about the Republic of Korea Armed Forces
South Korean pre-produced television series